Khairuddin bin Tarmizi is a Malaysian politician from UMNO. He was the Member of Perak State Legislative Assembly for Hutan Melintang from 2018 to 2022.

Politics 
He is the Deputy Chairman of UMNO Bagan Datuk branch.

Election result

External links

References 

United Malays National Organisation politicians
Members of the Perak State Legislative Assembly
Malaysian people of Malay descent
Living people
Year of birth missing (living people)